The Fairford River is a river of Manitoba, Canada. It flows out of the North end of Lake Manitoba into Lake Pineimuta and Lake St. Martin. Regulation of Lake Manitoba dates back to the  late 1890s and in 1961 the dam on the river, the Fairford River Water Control Structure (FRWCS) was completed to control outflows.

In times of low water, outflows from Lake Manitoba into the Fairford River are reduced, while during high water levels the gates of the control structure are open to allow water to run down the river and into Lake Pinemuta and Lake St. Martin before eventually ending up in Lake Winnipeg via the Dauphin River.

See also
Lake Manitoba
List of rivers of Manitoba

References

Rivers of Manitoba